Hydrazinophthalazines are a class of antihypertensive drugs including:

Hydralazine
Dihydralazine
Cadralazine
Endralazine

Chemically, the latter two aren't phthalazines; but they are classified as such in the World Health Organization's Anatomical Therapeutic Chemical Classification System.

References

Antihypertensive agents
Phthalazines